The 2014 Copa del Rey Juvenil is the 64th staging of the Copa del Rey Juvenil de Fútbol. The competition begins on May 18, 2014 and will end on June 29, 2014 with the final.

First round

The top two teams from each group and the two best third-placed teams are drawn into a two-game best aggregate score series. The first leg began the week of May 18 and the return leg the week of May 26.

 

|}

Quarterfinal

The eight winners from the first round advance to quarterfinal for a two-game series best aggregate score with the first leg beginning the week of June 1 and returning the week of June 8.

|}

Semifinals 

The four winners play a two-game series best aggregate score beginning the week of June 15 and returning the week of June 22.

|}

Final

The semifinal winners play a one-game final at a neutral site in Cartagena, Murcia on June 29.

Details

See also
2013–14 División de Honor Juvenil de Fútbol

References

Copa del Rey Juvenil de Fútbol
Juvenil